Aida of the Trees is a 2001 Italian musical adventure fantasy animated film written and directed by Guido Manuli with soundtrack by Ennio Morricone. It is the third movie produced by the studio Lanterna Magica after How the Toys Saved Christmas and Lucky and Zorba, and it is loosely inspired by Giuseppe Verdi's opera Aida.

Plot
Arborea and Petra are two neighbouring countries perpetually at war with one another.
Only the romantic relationship between Aida, the daughter of the Arborean king, and Radames, the brave son of the high general of Petra, will change the situation.
The couple's worst enemy is Ramfis, the high priest of the evil god Satam, who would like his clumsy son Kak to marry the princess of Petra (who's engaged to Radames).
After a series of adventures and fierce battles, Aida and Radames will manage to defeat Ramfis, to end the war between their countries and to live happily ever after.

Cast
 / Filippa Giordano as Aida 
 Simone D'Andrea/ Peppe Servillo as Radames  
 Enzo Iacchetti as Kak
 Massimo Lopez as Ramfis
  as Goa
  as Kanak
  as Raz
  as Satam
  as Amonastro
  as Amneris (voice) / Helena Hellwig as Amneris (sing)
 Ciro Imparato as Diaspron
 Michele Di Mauro as Moud 
 Gino Lana as Uzi

Production
This Italian musical adventure fantasy animated film was produced by Lanterna Magica in Turin, Italy. It uses both traditional animation (2D animation) and computer animation (3D animation) with Adobe After Effects (compositing and visual effects), Adobe Photoshop (background art), Autodesk Maya (compositing, computer animation and modeling), Autodesk Softimage (computer animation and sculpting), Avid Media Composer (video editing), oil-paint and paper (background art and oil-painting animation), Pegs (compositing, digital ink and paint and traditional animation), pencil and paper (hand-drawn animation and storyboards), Softimage 3D (computer animation and sculpting) and Toonz Premium (compositing, digital ink and paint and traditional animation).

References

External links

2001 films
2001 animated films
2001 fantasy films
Italian animated fantasy films
Italian animated films
Films scored by Ennio Morricone
Films based on operas
Animated musical films
Animated films based on literature